Percy Lacey is an American former Negro league pitcher who played in the 1930s.

Lacey played for the Newark Dodgers in 1935 and for the Philadelphia Stars in 1937. In five recorded career appearances on the mound, he posted a 6.56 ERA over 23.1 innings.

References

External links
 and Seamheads

Year of birth missing
Place of birth missing
Newark Dodgers players
Philadelphia Stars players
Baseball pitchers